Juan Antonio González Crespo (born 27 May 1972) is an Uruguayan retired footballer who played as a forward.

Club career
González was born in Montevideo. During his 15-year professional career, he represented Basañez, Club Nacional de Football, Centro Atlético Fénix, C.A. Cerro and River Plate de Montevideo in his homeland, also having abroad stints with Real Oviedo, Atlético Madrid – being loaned by the Asturias club in January 1999, he was highly unsuccessful – and Granada CF, all in Spain (the first two in La Liga).

In the 2004–05 season, González made a brief return to Oviedo, with the team then in the fourth division, wrapping up his career two years later with another former side, Fénix. In early 2008, González began a new career in his country as a bus driver.

International career
González made four appearances for Uruguay, during as many years. His first came on 11 October 1995, in a friendly with Brazil (0–1 loss, in Bahia).

References

External links

National team data 

1972 births
Living people
Footballers from Montevideo
Uruguayan footballers
Association football forwards
Uruguayan Primera División players
Club Nacional de Football players
Centro Atlético Fénix players
C.A. Cerro players
Club Atlético River Plate (Montevideo) players
La Liga players
Segunda División B players
Tercera División players
Real Oviedo players
Atlético Madrid footballers
Granada CF footballers
Uruguay international footballers
Uruguayan expatriate footballers
Expatriate footballers in Spain
Uruguayan expatriate sportspeople in Spain